Anthene paraffinis is a butterfly in the family Lycaenidae. It is found in South-east Asia.

Subspecies
A. p. paraffinis (New Britain, Duke of York, New Ireland, Fen, Witu Islands, Bougainville, Vella Lavella, Gizo, Choiseul, Alu, Rendova, Treasury Islands)
A. p. nissani Tite, 1966 (Nissan Island)
A. p. mathias Tite, 1966 (St. Matthias, Squally Islands)
A. p. nereia Tite, 1966 (Gizo, Guadalcanal, Florida Island, Tulagi, Ugi, Malaita)
A. p. emoloides Tite, 1966 (Sula, Buru, New Guinea)

References

Butterflies described in 1916
Anthene
Butterflies of Asia
Taxa named by Hans Fruhstorfer